Joseph of Spain was a Jewish merchant of the ninth and tenth centuries CE and may have been a Radhanite. It is unknown if he was the "Joseph of Spain" who authored numerous mathematical treatises in use in Europe in medieval times.

Abraham ibn Daud and other sources credit Joseph with bringing the so-called "Arabic numerals" from India to  Europe.

References

Weissenborn, Hermann Zur Geschichte der Einführung der jetzigen Ziffern in Europa durch Gerbert: eine Studie, Berlin: Mayer & Müller, 1892, pp. 74–78.

Explorers of Asia
9th-century mathematicians
10th-century mathematicians
Jewish Spanish history
9th-century merchants
10th-century merchants
European Sephardi Jews